This is a list of Bob Dylan songs based on earlier tunes. Throughout his career, Bob Dylan has drawn inspiration from many traditional folk sources, including the songs written by Dylan listed below, which borrow from earlier works.

See also 
 "Death Don't Have No Mercy"

References

Sources

 
Bob Dylan songs
Dylan, Bob